Memphis Sport is a sports and fitness magazine featuring articles on local and regional teams, players and events. In addition, Memphis Sport focuses on health and fitness for an active lifestyle. The magazine debuted in Memphis, Tennessee in July 2006. Local franchises covered include the University of Memphis Tigers, Memphis Redbirds, Mississippi Riverkings and Tennessee Titans.

The M Awards
The M Awards is Memphis Sport's annual celebration of the best of the best in Memphis sports. The M awards celebrates excellence in categories such as: favorite mascot, favorite concessions, and favorite sports bar. The first M Awards ballot debuted in the May/Jun 2007 issue. The results were broadcast live on the Chris Vernon show on ESPN 730 (KQPN) and published in the Jul/Aug 2007 issue.

Memphis Sport Live
Memphis Sport Live (commonly referred to as MSL) is a weekly radio program based on the popular Memphis Sport magazine. It broadcasts live on Sports 56 (WHBQ) at 11 AM Central every Saturday. Hosts Kevin Cerrito and Marcus Hunter are joined each week by various guests and notable local sports experts(often including Memphis broadcasting legend Jack Eaton). During the program Kevin and Marcus recap the week's top 5 stories in the Starting Five, plus they have other regular segments such as The Great Debate, The Cheerleader Interview without the Cheerleader,  Old School/New School, What You've Been Missing On MSNBC, and more.

References

External links
  Official website

Bimonthly magazines published in the United States
Sports magazines published in the United States
Local interest magazines published in the United States
Magazines established in 2006
Magazines published in Tennessee
Mass media in Memphis, Tennessee